Franklin April (18 April 1984 – 18 October 2015) was a Namibian football defender who played for FC Civics and the Namibia national football team. He was a part of the squad at the 2008 African Cup of Nations. April died from an asthma attack.

References

External links
Player profile

1984 births
2015 deaths
Namibia international footballers
2008 Africa Cup of Nations players
Association football defenders
Footballers from Windhoek
F.C. Civics Windhoek players
Namibian men's footballers